Inácio de Azevedo (1526–1570) was a Portuguese Jesuit missionary. He is one of the Forty Martyrs of Brazil, beatified by Pope Pius IX in 1854.

Early life 
He was born Dom Inácio de Azevedo de Ataíde Abreu e Malafaia in the city of Porto, probably in the first quarter of the year 1526. His family was prominent in the Portuguese nobility of that era. His father, Dom Manuel de Azevedo, was heir to two ancient feudal properties in northern Portugal, the honras of Barbosa and Ataíde. His mother, Dona Francisca de Abreu, was a daughter of the celebrated Portuguese poet and navigator, João Gomes de Abreu. And one of his younger brothers, Dom Jerónimo de Azevedo, was captain-general of Portuguese Ceylon and viceroy of Portuguese India.

He was an illegitimate son, legitimated by a Royal decree on July 22, 1539, as Dom Inácio de Ataíde (a surname of his grandmother - who was heiress of the honra of Ataíde - that he didn't use after joining the Jesuits) and educated at the Portuguese court of King John III. At the age of 18 he became administrator of his family's estate. However, after attending the sermons and speeches of Jesuit priest Francisco Estrada he chose to follow a religious career that would make him renounce his possessions, including his rights to the Feudal lordships of his father, in the northern Portuguese province of Entre Douro e Minho.

Jesuit Priest, Visitor of Brazil 
In 1548 he made an irrevocable choice of religious life and entered the Society of Jesus where he was finally ordained in 1553. That same year he was nominated rector of the Jesuit college of Santo Antão, in Lisbon, an institution he would endow - 7 years later - with a sum of 600,000 reais. From the beginning of 1557 to February 1558 Azevedo was rector of the College of Arts in Coimbra and from 1560 to 1564 he was the dean of the Jesuit College of Saint Paul, in the city of Braga. On April 9, 1563, he made his four final vows - of poverty, obedience, chastity, and special obedience to the Pope - in Coimbra.

In the early 1560s, Azevedo was involved in the financing for the construction of the Roman College, a major project of the Jesuits for which funds were badly needed. Azevedo's father was a wealthy man, with a fortune estimated at 12,000 Portuguese cruzados. According to the Jesuit constitutions, Azevedo would have to renounce all the rights to his inheritance before taking the final vows. The Jesuit General, Francis Borgia, thus suggested that he postpone the vows until the death of his father, who was already 74 by the end of the 1550s. This would open the possibility of Azevedo receiving the full inheritance, and then dedicate the entire sum of 12,000 cruzados to the building of the Roman College. But Dom Manuel de Azevedo's health proved to be robust - and he only agreed to make a special bequest to his son of 1,500 cruzados, to be paid during a period of three years, after 1560. Of this sum, 900 cruzados would end up being dedicated to the Roman College.

In 1565 Francis Borgia nominated him Visitor to Brazil, with special powers for the inspection of the Jesuit missions in that Portuguese colony. He arrived in the then capital city of Salvador da Bahia in August 1566 and he proceeded to visit all the Jesuit missions in Brazil, as a passenger of the fleet that governor Mem de Sá sent to Rio de Janeiro with the aim of expelling the French from Guanabara Bay. Azevedo witnessed the final, successful Portuguese assault on the French garrison in Guanabara that took place on January 18, 1567. He then proceeded towards São Vicente, where he met the priest Manuel da Nóbrega; they agreed on the foundation of a new Jesuit college in Rio de Janeiro, an institution whose charter was signed in 1568, with Nóbrega as its first dean.

Accompanied by Nóbrega and José de Anchieta he then visited the missions in the cities of São Paulo and Rio de Janeiro whose foundations were being laid. Azevedo returned to Salvador in January 1568 and in August he boarded a ship headed to Portugal, thus completing his two-year stay in Brazil.

In October 1568 he was back in Lisbon and in May 1569 he proceeded to Rome to report to Pope Pius V and Francis Borgia. In his final report, Inácio de Azevedo asked for more people to be sent to the missions and Borgia duly gave him broad powers to recruit new elements for the Jesuits in Brazil. Then, after several months of intense preparations that included several meetings with King Sebastian of Portugal, Azevedo and his companions finally left Portugal for Brazil on the merchant vessel Santiago on 5 June 1570, while another group of more than 20 companions boarded the military fleet of the newly appointed Governor General of Brazil.

Martyrdom 

During the trip to Brazil, on July 15, 1570, while sailing near the Canary Islands, the Santiago was attacked and captured by a fleet led by the French Huguenot corsair Jacques de Sores off Fuencaliente Lighthouse. Following the capture of the Santiago, the attackers spared the lives of some members of the crew but Azevedo and his 39 companions were massacred and their bodies thrown in the ocean.

Veneration 
The death of Inácio de Azevedo and his 39 companions on their voyage to Brazil at the hands of Calvinist corsairs was the biggest collective martyrdom of missionaries of the modern era and had great repercussion in the Europe of the time, torn by wars of religion and with a Catholic church strongly committed to developing its missions in America, Asia and Africa.

As early as 1571, on July 7, Pope Pius V honored the forty martyrs, referring to their "voluntary martyrdom" in the Brief Dum Indefese. According to tradition, St. Francis Borgia prayed daily to the forty martyrs, thus beginning a cult that would lead to their Beatification by Pope Pius IX on 11 May 1854.

Legacy 
The human and material loss of the martyrdom of Azevedo and his companions was certainly a momentary setback for the Jesuits in their project of conversion to Catholicism of the Brazilian Indians. However, the will to emulate the "forty martyrs of Brazil" soon gave rise to a new impulse and vitality in the movement for the overseas missions to which Inácio de Azevedo dedicated much of his life. And in Asia, his younger brother Jerónimo de Azevedo, governor and captain-general of Portuguese Ceylon from 1594 to 1612, was in a sense a prosecutor of Azevedo's work in another continent - for he was a dedicated supporter of the Jesuits and their missions, in the territory of present-day Sri Lanka.

In 1999, forty concrete crosses at the place of martyrdom, about 200 meters off the Fuencaliente Lighthouse were placed on the seabed by the government of the island La Palma. This place is situated in a depth of about 20 meters and is today a popular diving destination.

Adjacent to the old tower, another monument for the Forty Martyrs of Brazil has been erected in October 2014. This monument is a stone cross, with a plate on which the names of the martyrs are engraved.

References

External links 
 
 Catholic Forum article
 Catholic Online article

1527 births
1570 deaths
16th-century Portuguese Jesuits
Brazilian beatified people
Portuguese beatified people
Jesuit missionaries in Brazil
Jesuit martyrs
Portuguese people murdered abroad
Portuguese Roman Catholic missionaries
Roman Catholic missionaries in Brazil
People killed by pirates
People from Porto